Mstyora is the name of several inhabited localities in Vyaznikovsky District of Vladimir Oblast, Russia.

Urban localities
Mstyora (urban locality), a settlement

Rural localities
Mstyora (rural locality), a station